Shaheenabad , is a Town in Silanwali Tehsil of Sargodha District,  Punjab, Pakistan.

Shaheenabad railway station is situated on Sargodha-Shorkot railway line in middle of the Shaheenabad town. It is the junction for Shaheenabad-Chak Jhumra railway line. The station is staffed and has booking office. It is the stop of some express trains.

References

Populated places in Sargodha District